David Gunn is a former American football player and coach and an athletic administrator. He most recently served as the assistant athletic director for football at Auburn University from 2013 to 2017. Gunn served as the interim head football coach at Arkansas State University for one game in 2011 after having served as an assistant coach since 2002 at that school. In January of 2022, he was appointed head football coach at Paragould High School.

Head coaching record

College

Notes

References

Year of birth missing (living people)
Living people
American football defensive backs
American football running backs
Arkansas Razorbacks football players
Arkansas State Red Wolves football coaches
High school football coaches in Arkansas
High school football coaches in Texas